Albert Jackson may refer to:
Brian Jackson (cricketer) (Albert Brian Jackson, born 1933), former English cricketer
Albert Bruce Jackson (1876–1947), British botanist and dendrologist
Albert Jackson (mail carrier) (1857–1918), first Black Canadian mail carrier in Toronto
Albert Jackson (footballer) (1943–2014), English footballer
Albert Jackson, fictional character in Fat Albert and the Cosby Kids

See also
Bert Jackson (disambiguation)